Michel Duguet (born  1961) is a French Scrabble player who won the French World Scrabble Championships five times during the 1980s. His record of five world titles has never been broken but has been equaled by Christian Pierre during the 1990s. Despite both players being five-time world champions, it was Duguet that was awarded the prize of 'player of the century' at the World Championship in Paris in 2000.

Duguet only played ten seasons of French Scrabble, also winning the French national championship six times, the World Championship by pairs five times and the French championship by pairs twice. Away from Scrabble, he was the Des chiffres et des lettres champion in 1984, a game show based on anagrams and numbers games known as Countdown in the UK. After retiring from Scrabble in 1988, he took up bridge and ending up representing the French national team at the European Bridge championships in 2002, as well as winning the French cup (Coupe de France) of the bridge in 2004 with his wife Marlène. Duguet has occasionally come out of retirement to play Scrabble, finishing 7th at Vichy in 2006, a tournament which welcomes more than 1200 players each year.

Duguet is also an author and has written six books with Michel Charlemagne, another World Scrabble Champion who turned to card games after being World Scrabble Champion.

Notable achievements

Scrabble

Five time World Champion: 1982, 1983, 1985, 1987, 1988
Five times World Champion by pairs: 1982, 1983, 1985, 1986, 1988
Six time French national champion: 1981, 1982, 1983, 1984, 1985, 1987
Twice national champion by pairs: 1982, 1987

Bridge

9th place in the European Championship (with Marlène Duguet): 1998
2nd place in the European Championship (with Marlène Duguet): 2000
Winner of the 'Coupe de France' (with Marlène Duguet) : 2004
Member of the French national bridge team in 2002

Books

 1998 : Le Scrabble en 10 leçons par Michel Charlemagne and Michel Duguet, editions Minerva.
 1998 : Premiers pas au bridge by Michel Charlemagne and Michel Duguet, editions Marabout.
 1998 : Jouez au Scrabble avec Michel Duguet, editions Flammarion.
 1999 : Le grand livre de tous les jeux de cartes by Michel Charlemagne, Michel Duguet and Jean-Michel Maman.
 2003 : Le guide Marabout du bridge by Michel Charlemagne and Michel Duguet, editions Marabout.
 2005 : Le grand guide Marabout du bridge by Michel Charlemagne and Michel Duguet, editions Marabout.

See also

Contract bridge
Duplicate Scrabble
Francophone Scrabble

1961 births
French contract bridge players
French Scrabble players
Living people